Sarah Gibson Humphreys (Gibson; May 17, 1830 – May 31, 1907) was an American author and suffragist. In her day, Humphreys was the only woman in the United States ever put on the board of directors of a public road by the vote of the officers and stockholders, and probably the only one ever elected to the office of public lecturer to an Alliance lodge. She was known in Kentucky for her table settings and cooking. Humphreys died in 1907.

Early life and education
Sarah Thompson Gibson was born in Warren County, Mississippi, on May 17, 1830. Her father was Tobias Gibson, and her mother was Louisiana Breckenridge Hart, of Kentucky. Sarah was a niece of Louisiana Senator, Randall L. Gibson.

Until she was 14, Humphreys' education was supervised by her parents, although the most accomplished teachers were employed to instruct her. At 14, she was sent to the school of Miss Margaret Mercer, of Loudoun County, Virginia. For three years, she studied in the French school of Charles Picot in Philadelphia. Her mother died soon after her return from school, and she assumed the charge of her father's summer home in Lexington, Kentucky, as well as the winter plantation home in Louisiana, and took the place of her mother in the care and control of six brothers younger than herself, and an infant sister.

Career
In 1853, she married Joseph Alexander Humphreys, of Kentucky. He died  February 15, 1863, leaving her with a family of little children to bring up and a large estate to manage unaided. After the children got older and she was relieved of some financial responsibilities, Humphreys was able to follow her inclination in literary pursuits and the cause of the emancipation of woman. Her first literary work was a novel, which she wrote when only 13, and which was never published. For at least 10 years, she contributed stories, essays, letters, and sketches to various magazines and papers, always over a pen name. One of her contributions to Bedford's Magazine was the "Negro Libertines in the South."

The most original of Humphrey's literary productions was an article read before the Convention of the Kentucky Equal Rights Association on "Man and Woman in the Bible and in Nature," in which she advanced the theory of the sexual duality of God, of the Adam made in His image, and of all His creatures which were in the beginning spiritual. Through social persecution for her advanced position, the responsibilities of being a wife, mother, and widow, the word "Liberty" became a talisman to her. In her day, Humphreys was the only woman in the United States ever put on the board of directors of a public road by the vote of the officers and stockholders, and probably the only one ever elected to the office of public lecturer to an Alliance lodge.

Death
Sarah Gibson Humphreys died May 31, 1907.

References

Attribution

Bibliography

External links
 
 

1830 births
1907 deaths
19th-century American novelists
19th-century American women writers
People from Warren County, Mississippi
American suffragists
American women novelists
Novelists from Mississippi
Wikipedia articles incorporating text from A Woman of the Century